Henning Skumsvoll (born 15 March 1947 in Farsund) is a Norwegian politician representing the Progress Party.  He is currently a representative of Vest-Agder in the Storting, he was first elected in 2005. He was elected vice leader of the Vest Agder Progress Party in February 2004.

Skumsvoll has degrees in Civil Engineering and Business Administration from Heriot-Watt University in Scotland.

Parliamentary Committee duties
2005–2009 vice-secretary of the Odelsting.
2005–2009 member of the Defence committee.
2005–2009 member of the Extended Foreign Affairs committee.

External links

 Fremskrittspartiet - Biography

1947 births
Progress Party (Norway) politicians
Alumni of Heriot-Watt University
Living people
Members of the Storting
People from Farsund
21st-century Norwegian politicians